Zombie Hotel is a French/Irish animated children's television series about a hotel run by zombies, created by Jan Van Rijsselberge, produced by French production company Alphanim (now called Gaumont Animation) and shown internationally.

Premise
The main characters are Fungus and Maggot, two child zombies who pretend to be human to get into their local school, and their family and boarders at the hotel run by their parents. They make friends with Sam, a human boy whose mother is away most of the time. Sam soon finds out about their zombie powers and all three make a team of friends. Sam uses an old railway carriage as his haunt. The plot often involves a risk of the discovery of Maggot's and Fungus's zombie nature and the three trying to prevent this. The hotel itself is one of several main locations used in the show. Others include the school and Sam's railway carriage.

Characters
Maggot: The courageous, bossy and hot-headed twin sister of Fungus. (Voiced by Aileen Mythen)
Fungus: The hardworking, cool brother who loves doing impossible DIY. (Voiced by Hillary Kavanagh)
Sam: Maggot's and Fungus's black human friend.
Rictus: The children's father who runs the Zombie Hotel. He doesn't get along with his father well. (Voiced by Roger Gregg)
Funerella: Rictus's wife and the children's mother. She gets worried a lot, but loves her family. (Voiced by Susan Slott)
Grandpa: Rictus's father and the children's grandfather.
Jeebies: The hotel's elderly butler who has a hunched back. He is quite prone to losing his limbs. (Voiced by Rod Goodall)
Chef: A grouchy vampire who is the head chef in the hotel. He is known for his horrible food creations which even the zombies find hard to eat sometimes. His father is inspired by Count Dracula.
Wilson: Chef's assistant. His head is detachable and it is shown he can replace it with a new one. (Voiced by Philip McGettigan)
The Colonel: A small-headed, but rotund bodied zombie who used to be in the military. He is a resident of the hotel and often rolls using his round shape. In the second episode, it shows that he may have some feelings for Dame Fedora. (Voiced by Paul Tylak)
Dame Fedora: A ghost resident at the hotel who never stops complaining about things. 
Uncle Von: Maggot's and Fungus's mad scientist uncle. He has a laboratory in the hotel. In the English dub, he speaks with the German accent.
Francis: Von's creation and sidekick, a Frankenstein's monster-style character.
Tut: A mummified DJ who likes telling bad jokes. (Voiced by Gary Hetzler)
Ms. Harriet Harbottle: Maggot's and Fungus's teacher. (Voiced by Danna Davis)
Mr. Peabody: The headteacher of Maggot's and Fungus's school. (Voiced by Patrick Fitzsymons)
Harvey Justine: Harbottle's nephew who Maggot, Fungus and Sam have to often reluctantly babysit. He's similar to Sam in that he loves zombies, though he doesn't yet realize that Maggot and Fungus aren't dressed up and wearing makeup like zombies.
Araminta: Sam's mother who is away on business a lot. At first, she thought her son shouldn't be friend with Maggot and Fungus.
Basil: A school bully who is the enemy of Maggot, Fungus and Sam.
Eli: A student genius at school. When he made a presentation about zombies, he thought that they are dumb creatures, which offended Maggot and Fungus.
Lucy: A popular girl at school who often makes fun of Maggot and Fungus.
Dominica: A goth girl who is in love with Fungus.

Episodes 
First Day
Love is in the Air
Plumbing the Depths
Zombie Pride
Brat Attack
There's Something About Zombies
Vote for Zombie
Happy People
Oh My Goth!
It's Not Fair
Funerella's Deathday
The Bogeyman Cometh
Dead Trendy
Something Old, Something Newt
Too Many Cooks
Hexed
Inspector Fungus
School Exchange
Movie Madness
The Wrong Von
Night of the Undead Babysitters!
Toying with Magic
Carrots, Sticks and Robots
A Zombie's Best Friend
The Hug Bug
A Class Act

Awards 
Zombie Hotel has won a number of awards including Best TV series at the Federation of Indian Chambers of Commerce and Industry 2006 awards.

References

External links
 
Retrojunk: Zombie Hotel

2005 Irish television series debuts
2006 Irish television series endings
2000s French animated television series
2005 French television series debuts
2006 French television series endings
French children's animated comedy television series
French children's animated horror television series
Australian Broadcasting Corporation original programming
BBC children's television shows
Disney Channel original programming
Gaumont Animation
Gothic television shows
Television series set in hotels
Television series created by Jan Van Rijsselberge